"Teach Me Again" is a single that was released in 2006 by American singer Tina Turner and Italian pop singer Elisa. The song was recorded for the film All the Invisible Children. The duet was a number one single in Italy and also charted in a few other European countries like Germany, Switzerland and Austria.

Track listing and formats
European CD maxi single
"Teach Me Again" – 4:33
"Teach Me Again" (Instrumental) – 4:33
"Teach Me Again" (Elisa's Version) – 4:42
"Teach Me Again" (Video) – 4:35

Chart performance

Weekly charts

References

Tina Turner songs
2006 singles
Number-one singles in Italy
Elisa (Italian singer) songs
Songs written by Elisa (Italian singer)
2005 songs
Capitol Records singles